Kul Khodadad (also Romanized as Kūl Khodādād) is a village in Hati Rural District, Hati District, Lali County, Khuzestan Province, Iran. As of the 2006 census, its population was 55 people in 7 families.

References 

Populated places in Lali County